Circense is a 1980 studio album recorded by the Brazilian composer and multi-instrumentalist Egberto Gismonti. The album was created with the idea of being a "musical circus" and its sessions feature some of the most beloved Brazilian musicians of that period.

It was listed by Rolling Stone Brazil as one of the 100 best Brazilian albums in history.

Track listing

Personnel 
 Egberto Gismonti: ten-string acoustic guitar, piano and vocals
 Mauro Senise: saxophone and flute
 Luiz Alves: bass
 Robertinho Silva: percussion
 Silvio Mehry: piano
 Pery Reis: guitar
 Aleuda Malu: vocals and percussion
 Dulce Bressane: vocals
 Pepê Castro-Neves: vocals
 Benito Juarez: string orchestra conduction

Special guest:
 Lakshminarayana Shankar: violin (in "Cego Aderaldo")

References 

1980 albums
Egberto Gismonti albums